"Love It" is a song by American singer-songwriter Bilal, a track from album, 1st Born Second. The song was released as the second single from the album in 2001 and reached No. 61 on the Billboard R&B singles chart.

Track listing
US CD single

Charts

References

2001 singles
Bilal (American singer) songs
Songs written by Mike City
2000 songs
Interscope Records singles